Samantha Fox is an English singer and former glamour model.

Samantha Fox may also refer to:
 Samantha Fox (American actress), a pornographic and B movie actress
 Samantha Fox (politician), an American politician
 Samantha Fox (album), an album by the English singer